Mahendra Singh Mahra (born Siltham, Pithoragarh district, Uttarakhand) is an Indian politician and agriculturist who served as a Member of Parliament, Rajya Sabha from Uttarakhand (April 2012 to April 2018), served as Minister Agriculture, Agricultural Marketing & Watershed Management, Government of Uttarakhand (2002 to 2007) and served as a four time MLA.

He also served as Member of the Parliamentary Standing Committee on Rural development. Presently he is a member of AIIMS, Rishikesh.

Early life and education

Mahendra Singh Mahra was born on to Bishan Singh Mahra and Parvati Mahra who hailed from a  Jagirdar Thakur family of a town of Pithoragarh. He finished his Primary and secondary education in a school run by the missionaries in Pithoragarh.

His father Bishan Singh Mahra was the first Chairperson of the township of Pithoragarh. His uncle Uday Singh Mahra served the people of the town by laying the founding stone of the town's only library, Nagar Palika, sports ground, etc. Following his father's and uncle's footsteps, young Mahra got into politics.

Personal life

In the year 1984 Mahra married Vaijayanti who hails from the princely state of Bhavnagar. Vaijayanti's great grandfather (paternal) was first cousin of Maharaja Krishna Kumar Singhji of Bhavnagar, Gujarat and her maternal great grandfather was the younger brother of Maharaja Amar Singh ji, Rajadhiraj Banera, Rajasthan.

They have three children, two daughters and a son.

A great football player, boxer and a heavy weight-lifter Mahra takes keen interest in channeling the energy of youngsters of his town by promoting sports.

Political career

Mahra once said that he chose Congress because he can relate to the views of the party. In the year 1967 Mahra organized the district youth to welcome the then Prime Minister Mrs. Indira Gandhi and it was in her presence that he was sworn in as a member of Congress.

1970 - 1977 he served as a member of Nagar Palika Parishad, Pithoragarh
1974 - 1984 he became the President district youth Congress, Pithoragarh
1972 - 1988 Treasurer District Congress Committee, Pithoragarh
1980 - 1985 Member parvatiya vikas parishad Lucknow

January 1989 he became an unopposed Chairman Zila Parishad, Pithoragarh and the same year he organized a visit of Late. Prime Minister (Shri) Rajiv Gandhi and Smt. Sonia Gandhi to the district of Pithoragarh. December same year, 1989 he became an MLA for the first time.
December 1989 to  March 1991 MLA UP assembly
November 1993 to September 1995 MLA UP Assembly
1991 to 2000 Member Pradesh Congress Committee, UP
1991 to 2007 Member All India Congress Committee, New Delhi
2000 to 2009 General Secretary Pradesh Congress Committee, Uttarakhand
2002 to 2007 Minister Agriculture, Agricultural Marketing & Watershed Management, Govt of Uttarakhand 
2007 to 2012 MLA Uttarakhand Assembly
2012 to 2018 MP, Rajya Sabha.

References

1939 births
Living people
Indian National Congress politicians
Rajya Sabha members from Uttarakhand
People from Pithoragarh district
Uttarakhand politicians